Mark David Beaufait (born May 13, 1970) is an American former professional ice hockey player. He resides in Grand Rapids, Michigan. He played 5 games in the National Hockey League (NHL) with the San Jose Sharks during the 1992–93 season. The rest of his career, which lasted from 1992 to 2009, was spent mainly in the International Hockey League and in the Deutsche Eishockey Liga - where he won 4 championships with Eisbären Berlin. Internationally he played for the American national team at the 1994 Winter Olympics.

Playing career 
As a youth, Beaufait played in the 1982 and 1983 Quebec International Pee-Wee Hockey Tournaments with the Detroit Compuware and Michigan Dynamos minor ice hockey teams.

Beaufait attended Northern Michigan University from 1988 to 1992, winning the 1991 NCAA championship, and then turned pro.

He played five games for the San Jose Sharks of the NHL during the 1992–93 season. He was a member of the 1994 US Olympic team.

After playing for the Kansas City Blades and the San Diego Gulls, he embarked on a six-year stint with fellow IHL side Orlando Solar Bears, winning the Turner Cup in 2001, while leading the team in scoring, followed by a single season with AHL's Houston Aeros (2001–02).

He spent the last seven years of his career playing for the Eisbären Berlin of the German DEL. Beaufait appeared in 400 DEL games for Berlin between 2002 and 2009, scoring 134 goals, while assisting on 249 more. He won four national championships with the Eisbären team, while leading the league in scoring in 2002-03. He retired on April 16, 2009. In January 2011, he had his jersey number 19 retired by the Eisbären Berlin organization.

Coaching career 
He coaches his son Cole, as the head coach of Little Caesers Peewee AAA Team in Grand Rapids and was named full-time assistant coach of East Kentwood High School in Kentwood, Michigan, prior to the 2010–11 season.

Career statistics

Regular season and playoffs

International

Awards and honors

References

External links

1970 births
Living people
American men's ice hockey right wingers
Eisbären Berlin players
Houston Aeros (1994–2013) players
Ice hockey players from Michigan
Ice hockey players at the 1994 Winter Olympics
Kansas City Blades players
National Hockey League supplemental draft picks
NCAA men's ice hockey national champions
Northern Michigan Wildcats men's ice hockey players
Olympic ice hockey players of the United States
Orlando Solar Bears (IHL) players
Sportspeople from Royal Oak, Michigan
San Diego Gulls (IHL) players
San Jose Sharks draft picks
San Jose Sharks players